Ana Ibáñez Llorente (born Haro, La Rioja, Spain 1981) is a Spanish television news anchor based in Madrid, Spain. She can be seen on La 1.

References

External links
 WebMii: Ana Ibanez
 Internet Movie Data Base: Ana Ibáñez Llorente
 

Spanish television presenters
Spanish women television presenters
Living people
1981 births